Guo Peng (born July 1, 1982 in Taiyuan, Shanxi) is a male Chinese volleyball player. He was part of the silver medal winning team at the 2006 Asian Games.

He competed for Team China at the 2008 Summer Olympics in Beijing.

References
Profile

1982 births
Living people
Chinese men's volleyball players
Olympic volleyball players of China
Sportspeople from Taiyuan
Volleyball players at the 2008 Summer Olympics
Volleyball players from Shanxi
Asian Games medalists in volleyball
Volleyball players at the 2006 Asian Games
Volleyball players at the 2010 Asian Games
Medalists at the 2006 Asian Games
Asian Games silver medalists for Japan
21st-century Chinese people